The 2010 Super League season (known as the Engage Super League XV for sponsorship reasons) was the 15th season of the European rugby league football competition, Super League. Fourteen teams competed for the League Leaders' Shield over 27 rounds (including the Magic Weekend at Murrayfield Stadium). All clubs also participated in the 2010 Challenge Cup tournament. The season officially kicked off on 5 February with the Crusaders versus the Leeds Rhinos on 29 January at Crusaders' new homeground at the Racecourse Ground in Wrexham. Crusaders halfback Michael Witt scored the first points of the season with a penalty goal and the Rhinos came away with the first competition points, posting a 34 to 6 victory.

The season came to a conclusion with Wigan Warriors beating St. Helens 22-10 in the Super League Grand Final on 2 October with two tries for Martin Gleeson.

Teams
Super League XV was the second year of a licensed Super League. Under this system, promotion and relegation between Super League and National League One was abolished, and 14 teams were granted licences subject to certain criteria. All twelve teams from Super League XIII were given places, as well as former Super League team Salford City Reds and Crusaders.

Geographically, the vast majority of teams in Super League are based in the north of England, four teams – Warrington, St. Helens, Salford and Wigan – to the west of the Pennines in Cheshire, Greater Manchester and Merseyside, and seven teams to the east in Yorkshire – Huddersfield, Bradford, Wakefield Trinity, Leeds, Castleford, Hull F.C. and Hull Kingston Rovers. Catalans Dragons are the only team based in France and are outside of the United Kingdom. Crusaders are the only team in Wales, and Harlequins are the only team to be based in a capital city (London).

Rules

Rule changes
The RFL announced two new rule interpretations intended to increase player safety in the tackle:
 Referees now call "held" if one of the ball-carrier's legs is lifted by a defender in a tackle in which the participants are stood upright. Previously, a referee would only declare the tackle complete if both legs had been lifted.
 Referees now call held as soon as they see the ball-carrier being dragged by more than one defender. This prevents groups of defenders dragging an opponent into touch or the in-goal area.

Operational rules
The 'club trained player rule' entered its third year and made a planned adjustment:
 Clubs would be required to include a minimum of seven players, an increase from six players, who have come through their academy or are under 21 years old in their 25-player first team squads. British clubs were required to have twelve United Kingdom-trained players, an increase from eleven, and no more than six overseas-trained players, a decrease from eight.
 Crusaders were granted dispensation to include up to fourteen overseas-trained players for the 2010 season as the Welsh club is considered to be still developing.

Results

Season Summary
January

 29 - Leeds Rhinos win the first game of 2010 against a new look Crusaders  34-6 in a snow filled Racecourse Ground, Wrexham. This match set a home record attendance for Crusaders of 10,334, which is also a record attendance for a Welsh rugby league fixture on home soil.

February

 17 - Wakefield Trinity Wildcats hooker Terry Newton is provisionally suspended by the UK Anti-Doping Agency after testing positive for a banned substance
 22 - Wakefield Trinity Wildcats cancelled the contract of Terry Newton following his two-year ban from rugby for taking the  self-administered human growth hormone HGH, later that year Newton died in his home in Orrell.
 26 - Wigan Warriors equal Warrington's record win of the season with a 58-0 win of their own, this time against Catalans Dragons with 3 tries of Pat Richards' 38 point haul coming in the first 20 minutes of the game
 28 - Leeds Rhinos lose the 2010 World Club Challenge 18-10 against the Melbourne Storm

April
 1 - The first draw of Super League XV is recorded when Leeds and Bradford drew 20 - 20 at Headingley Carnegie
 2 - St Helens are defeated 10 - 18 by Wigan Warriors in the last local derby match to be played between the two sides at Knowsley Road

May
 1 - Warrington Wolves record the biggest win of the season with a 16-68 victory against Salford City Reds at the Magic Weekend at Murrayfield
 15 - Salford City Reds produce a shock 42-34 victory over St. Helens at The Willows in a 'repeat' of last year's game there.

August
 22 - Wigan Warriors secured the League Leaders' Shield with an 18-38 victory at Hull Kingston Rovers

September
 4 - St. Helens beat Castleford Tigers 40-30 in the final ever league game at Knowsley Road. Captain Keiron Cunningham sealed the win with a last minute try - A score which moved St Helens above Warrington into 2nd place on points difference alone, meaning the Saints will host Warrington in the playoffs the following week.

October
 2 - Wigan Warriors won their first title since 1998 with a 22-10 win over rivals St Helens in the Grand Final at Old Trafford.

Table

Play-offs

The play-offs commence following the conclusion of 27 round regular season. To decide the grand finalists from the top eight finishing teams, Super League adopts the unique Super League play-off system. The finals will conclude with the 2010 Super League Grand Final.

Awards
Awards have been presented for outstanding contributions and efforts to players and clubs:
 Man of Steel: Pat Richards (Wigan Warriors)
 Young Player of the Year: Sam Tomkins (Wigan Warriors)
 Coach of the Year: Michael Maguire (Wigan Warriors)
 Top Tackler: Dallas Johnson (Catalans Dragons)
 Top Points Scorer: Pat Richards (Wigan Warriors)
 Most Meters: James Graham (St. Helens)
 Team of the Season: Wigan Warriors
 Albert Goldthorpe Medal: Pat Richards and Sam Tomkins (both Wigan Warriors)
 Rugby League Writers Player of the Year: Pat Richards (Wigan Warriors)

Disciplinary record

The following table lists all incidents that were reviewed by the Rugby Football League during Super League XV, which were later deemed "guilty" and resulted in disciplinary action. The offenses were graded, depending on severity, in alphabetical order, "A" being less severe than "B".

Media

Television
2010 was the second of a three-year broadcasting agreement between the RFL and BSkyB for Sky Sports to screen matches exclusively live within the United Kingdom. The deal for the 2009, 2010 and 2011 season was worth in excess of £50 million.

Sky Sports' continued coverage in the UK sees two live matches broadcast each week - one on Friday at 7:30pm and another at 6pm on Saturday. Regular commentators are Eddie Hemmings and Mike Stephenson with summarisers including Phil Clarke, Barrie McDermott and Terry O'Connor. Highlights are shown on Boots N' All which is shown on Sky Sports and is rebroadcast on the Internet.

BBC Sport broadcast a highlights programme called the Super League Show, usually presented by Harry Gration. The BBC have elected to broadcast this only to the North West, Yorkshire and North Midlands, North East and Cumbria, and East Yorkshire and Lincolnshire regions on a Sunday. A national repeat is broadcast overnight during the week, the BBC Director of Sport, Richard Moseley, commented that this move was in response to the growing popularity and awareness of the sport, and the large number of requests from people who want to watch it elsewhere in the UK. End of season play-offs are shown across the whole country in a highlights package. Super League Show is available for streaming or downloaded using the BBC iPlayer in the UK.

Orange Sport TV in France shows every Catalans Dragons home match live and also some other matches which are broadcast in the UK live on Sky.

Internationally Super League is shown live on Showtime Sports (Middle East), Sky Sport (New Zealand), NTV+ (Russia), SportKlub (Eastern Europe).

2010 was the second year of a three-year deal in which the Nine Network in Australia show up to 70 live games from Super League over the season.

In the United States America One show live Super League games from 2010.

Channel Nine started coverage of 2010 matches from 7 March at midnight (leading into Monday morning) due to coverage of the Winter Olympics they could not show the earlier matches.

Radio
Super League XV is covered extensively by BBC Local Radio:
 BBC Radio Manchester cover Wigan, Salford and Warrington
 BBC Radio Humberside cover Hull KR and Hull
 BBC Radio Leeds cover Bradford, Leeds, Castleford, Wakefield and Huddersfield
 BBC Radio Merseyside (AM/DAB only) cover St Helens and Warrington

The competition is also covered on commercial radio coverage:

 BCB 106.6 (Bradford Community Broadcasting) cover Bradford Bulls home and away
 Radio Aire cover Leeds Rhinos
 KCFM Hull cover Hull KR and Hull
 Radio Marseillette covers every Catalans Dragons Home Match (in French)
 Radio France Bleu Roussillon covers every Catalans Dragons Away Match (in French)
 Yorkshire Radio cover all Yorkshire clubs and have one commentary per round which is not covered by either BBC or Sky

All Super League commentaries on any station are available via the particular stations on-line streaming.

Internet
ESPN3 has worldwide broadband rights.

Starting from 9 April 2009, all of the matches shown on Sky Sports are also available live online via Livestation everywhere in the world excluding the US, Puerto Rico, UK, Ireland, France, Monaco, Australia and New Zealand.

In the United Kingdom, BBC London 94.9, BBC Radio Wales and Radio Warrington cover Harlequins, Crusaders (home games) and Warrington (home games) respectively.

References